This article lists results and squads for the finals of the FA Youth Cup.

Finals: 1953–2019

2019–20: Manchester City 3–2 Chelsea

 

 
 
|-
|colspan=4|Substitutes:
|-
 
 
 
 

 

|-
|colspan=4|Coach:  Carlos Vicens
|-

 
 

 

 
 

|-
|colspan=4|Substitutes:
|-

 
 

|-
|colspan=4|Coach:  Ed Brand
|-

2020–21: Aston Villa 2–1 Liverpool

 
 

 
 
|-
|colspan=4|Substitutes:
|-
 
 
 
 

 

|-
|colspan=4|Coach:  Sean Verity
|-

 
 

 
 
 
 

|-
|colspan=4|Substitutes:
|-

 
 
 

|-
|colspan=4|Coach:  Marc Bridge-Wilkinson
|-

2021–22: Manchester United 3–1 Nottingham Forest

 
 

 
 
 
|-
|colspan=4|Substitutes:
|-
 
 
 
 
 

|-
|colspan=4|Coach:  Travis Binnion
|-

 
 

 
 
 
 

 
|-
|colspan=4|Substitutes:
|-

 
 
 
 

 
|-
|colspan=4|Coach:  Warren Joyce
|-

References

External links
The FA Youth Cup at The Football Association official website

 
Finals